Major-General Sir Harry Davis Watson,  (18 July 1866 – 7 May 1945) was a British Army officer. He was the son of General Sir John Watson.

Watson served as Chief Administrator of Palestine in 1919, after his predecessor had been removed by London for not favoring the Zionists over the Arabs; Watson was removed six months later for the same reason.

Military career
Watson was commissioned a lieutenant in the Dorset Regiment on 29 April 1885. He transferred to British India, and saw action in the Sikkim expedition.

Promoted to captain in 1896, he served in the Imperial Service Troops of India.

In 1906 he was appointed as an extra equerry to the Prince of Wales, who became George V in 1910. Watson later served in the First World War, first as Inspector-General of the Imperial Service Troops, and subsequently given control of the 20th Indian Brigade which served in the Sinai and Palestine Campaign.

He was Chief Administrator of British occupied Palestine from June 1919 to December 1919.

References

1866 births
1945 deaths
Indian Army generals of World War I
Knights Commander of the Order of the British Empire
Administrators of Palestine
Dorset Regiment officers
British Indian Army generals
British military personnel of the Sikkim expedition